The Keith and Dufftown Railway ("The Whisky Line") is a heritage railway in Scotland, running for  from , Keith (Ordnance Survey grid reference ) to  via  and Auchindachy.

Originally the former Great North of Scotland Railway's Keith and Dufftown Railway which was part of the link Aberdeen with Elgin (with the Strathspey Railway and Morayshire Railway), the line was latterly a freight-only branch for British Rail, truncated at Dufftown and serving the distillery there. Regular passenger services had been withdrawn in May 1968, but in later years it hosted a series of Northern Belle summer Sunday lunch specials from Aberdeen. These ceased in 1991 and after several years disuse, the line passed into the hands of the current operator in 1998; regular heritage trains then began running in 2000.

The line is open, and a regular service runs throughout the railway's operating season from March to September. Special events are also run, including Santa Specials and Scots Nights. These services are run on the Class 108 DMUs.

Dufftown is the main centre of operation of the railway, and has a booking office, a waiting room and a café called the Sidings Café, which is open March to November. There are two headshunts and a loop. Work is being undertaken to install a new loop at Dufftown so that there can be two tracks going into the new engine shed.

At Keith Town station, there is a booking office and a shop which sells railway memorabilia, books, Thomas the Tank Engine items and model railway items which are sold by members of the association. This shop too is also only open during the operating season.

At present there is no connection to the main line: there are two 60 ft sections of track uplifted (these were removed in 1998 when the line was handed over). However, there are long-term plans to reconnect to the mainline; there were discussions about this between the K&DRA, the local MSP Richard Lochhead and Transport Scotland in the autumn of 2015.

Rolling stock

The railway also owns two BR Mk1 Coaches No81295 and No975758, and a Mk2f TSO.  The Mk2f arrived to replace the two Pullman coaches that were returned south.

The Keith and Dufftown also have 3 Canadian Sprinters which could be used to inspect the line, on top of all this the railway also has a variety of permanent way wagons, some of this includes, 2 "Grampus" wagons, a "Dogfish" ballast wagon, a "Salmon" wagon and a guard's van.

References

External links
 Video footage of Dufftown railway station.
 Video footage of the stations on the line.

 The Railway website

Heritage railways in Scotland
Transport in Moray
Railway museums in Scotland
Standard gauge railways in Scotland